

Events
The Harlem Globetrotters play their first game.

Championships
Men
 AAU
Hillyard Chemical 29, Ke-Nash-A 10

Births
March 11 — Vince Boryla, NBA player, coach and executive (died 2016)
December 2 — Ralph Beard, All-American at Kentucky.  Two-time National Champion and Olympic Gold Medalist (died 2007)